Dryptodon is a genus of mosses belonging to the family Grimmiaceae.

The genus has almost cosmopolitan distribution.

Species:
 Dryptodon austrofunalis (Müll.Hal.) Ochyra & Żarnowiec 
 Dryptodon brachydictyon (Cardot) Ochyra & Żarnowiec

References

Grimmiales
Moss genera